The 2015 Ron Massey Cup is the 15th season of the semi-professional development level rugby league competition in New South Wales, Australia, run jointly by the New South Wales Rugby League and the Country Rugby League of New South Wales.

Clubs
In 2015, 11 clubs are fielding teams in the Ron Massey Cup.
 Auburn Warriors
 Asquith Magpies
 Blacktown Workers
 Concord-Burwood Wolves
 Cabramatta Two Blues
 Guildford Owls
 Kingsgrove Colts
 Mounties
 Western Suburbs Magpies
 Windsor Wolves
 Wentworthville Magpies

Season

Round 1

Round 2

Round 3

Round 4

 • Note: The matches between Wolves v Mounties and Wenty v Cabramatta were played later on in the season as a 'washout game' after violent storms cancelled the match early in 2015.

Round 5

Round 6

Round 7

Round 8

Round 9

Round 10

Round 11

Round 12

Round 13

Round 14

Round 15

Round 16

Round 17

Round 18

Round 19

Round 20

Round 21

Round 22

Round 23

Round 24

Finals series
For the fourth year in a row, the NSWRL will use the finals system previously implemented by the ARL competition from the 1990s (also used by the Australian Football League) to decide the grand finalists from the top eight finishing teams.

Chart

See also

 2015 New South Wales Cup season
 New South Wales Rugby League
 Country Rugby League

References

External links

2015 in Australian rugby league
Ron Massey Cup